Ivan Doig (June 27, 1939 – April 9, 2015) was an American author and novelist, widely known for his sixteen fiction and non-fiction books set mostly in his native Montana, celebrating the landscape and people of the post-war American West.

With settings ranging from the Rocky Mountain Front to Alaska's coast, Puget Sound and Oregon, the Chicago Tribune noted in 1987 that Doig wrote of "immigrant families, dedicated schoolteachers, miners, fur trappers, town builders" and of "the uncertainties of friendship and love, and colossal battles of will, set amid the vast unpredictabilities of a land noted for sudden deadly floods, agonizing droughts, blizzards and forest fires." Doig himself would later say "I come from the lariat proletariat, the working-class point of view." In particular, Doig "believed that ordinary people deserve to have their stories told" This House of Sky: Landscapes of a Western Mind, Doig's 1977 memoir, was finalist for the National Book Award for Contemporary Thought. In 2007 Doig won the University of Colorado's Center of the American West's Wallace Stegner Award. Doig's 2006 novel The Whistling Season became a New York Times best-seller. He won the Western Literature Association's lifetime Distinguished Achievement award and held the distinction of the only living author with works of both fiction and non-fiction listed in the top 12 of the San Francisco Chronicle poll of best books of the 20th century. Doig's life and his works are the focus of the documentary film by Montana PBS and 4:08 productions, "Ivan Doig: Landscapes of a Western Mind". 

In 2006, Sven Birkerts described Doig as "a presiding figure in the literature of the American West."

Early life
Doig was born in White Sulphur Springs, Montana to Charles "Charlie" Doig, ranch hand and Bernita Ringer Doig, ranch cook. After the death of his mother on his sixth birthday, he was raised by his father and his grandmother Elizabeth "Bessie" Ringer. Doig moved with his father and grandmother on a series of jobs, the ranch equivalent of sharecropping, subsequently moving to Dupuyer, Montana to herd sheep close to the Rocky Mountain Front. As a child, Doig read comics, sports pages and magazines like Life, Colliers and The Saturday Evening Post.

Doig graduated salutatorian in a class of 21 students from Valier High School in Valier, Montana. He won a full-tuition scholarship to Northwestern University, where he earned a bachelor's degree in 1961 and a master's degree in journalism in 1962. His master's thesis was on the subject of televised congressional hearings on organized crime. He later earned a Ph.D. in American history at the University of Washington, writing his dissertation on John J. McGilvra (1827-1903).

Important first-hand influences on his writing included his high school English and Latin teacher, Frances Tidyman; Sam Jamison, who taught him reporting at Northwestern; and Ben Baldwin, who taught him broadcast news.

After he earned his degree in 1962, Doig was drafted into the Air Force Reserve. He was released from active duty in 1963. Doig lived with his wife Carol Doig, née Muller, a university professor of English, in Seattle, Washington until his death from multiple myeloma in 2015.

He was related to Fully Informed Jury Association co-founder, Don Doig.

Career in writing
Before becoming a novelist, Doig wrote for newspapers and magazines as a free-lancer and worked for the United States Forest Service.  Doig served as an editorial writer for the Lindsay-Schaub newspaper chain in Decatur, Illinois, and served as assistant editor of The Rotarian magazine in Evanston, Illinois.

The western landscape and people play an important role in Doig's fiction, with much of it set in the Montana country of his youth. His major theme is family life in the past, mixing personal memory and regional history. The first three Montana novels—English Creek, Dancing at the Rascal Fair, and Ride with Me, Mariah Montana, form the "McCaskill trilogy", covering the first century of Montana statehood from 1889 to 1989.

Personal life
Ivan met his future wife, Carol Muller, at the Medill School of Journalism at Northwestern University while the two were students. They married on April 17, 1965. The two did not have any children. Carol assisted Ivan in writing and editing his books and was a longtime professor of journalism.

Later years
In 2001, Ivan was diagnosed with MGUS (monoclonal gammopathy of unknown significance). In 2006, he was diagnosed with “smoldering myeloma,” which can remain dormant for years. In November, doctors told Ivan that his high levels of proteins meant that his myeloma was progressing. Ivan kept a detailed record of his medical journey in journals now held by Montana State University in the Ivan Doig archive. He died from multiple myeloma on April 9, 2015.

Ivan Doig Archive
In October 2015, Carol Doig donated her husband's extensive holding of notes, photos and records of his writing to the Montana State University Library Merrill G. Burlingame Special Collections.  Montana State University was chosen over offers from Stanford University and the University of Washington based in part on the MSU Library's promise to digitize the entire collection in less than one year and make it available on a public website, as well as on MSU's proximity to Doig's childhood home and the encouragement of Montana authors Rick Bass, Tom McGuane and Jamie Ford.

The Ivan Doig Archive consists of manuscripts, proofs and galleys, typed and handwritten writing fragments, pocket notebooks, note cards, diaries, journals, photographs, audio/visual material, and memorabilia created or collected by Ivan Doig. The material has been sorted into twelve series based on subject and/or document type. Physical artifacts are preserved within Montana State University Library's Merrill G. Burlingame Special Collections.

This archive includes a collaboration with Acoustic Atlas, the Soundscapes of Ivan Doig, with recordings and interviews from the lands and peoples featured in his novels.

Works

Novels 
 The Sea Runners (1982)
 English Creek (1984)
 Dancing at the Rascal Fair (1987)
 Ride with Me, Mariah Montana (1990)
 Bucking the Sun (1996)
 Mountain Time (1999)
 Prairie Nocturne (2003)
 The Whistling Season (2006)
 The Eleventh Man (2008)
 Work Song  (2010)
 The Bartender's Tale (2012)
 Sweet Thunder (2013)
 Last Bus to Wisdom (2015)

Nonfiction 
 News: A Consumer's Guide (1972) - a media textbook coauthored by Carol Doig
 This House of Sky: Landscapes of a Western Mind (1978) - memoirs based on the author's life with his father and grandmother (nominated for National Book Award)
 Winter Brothers: A Season at the Edge of America (1980) - an essayistic dialog with James G. Swan
 Heart Earth (1993) - memoirs based on his mother's letters to her brother Wally

Edited volumes 
Streets We Have Come Down: Literature of the City (1975)
Utopian America: Dreams and Realities (1976)

Awards
 Finalist, National Book Award, This House of Sky (1979)
 Christopher Award, This House of Sky (1979)
 Pacific Northwest Booksellers Award for Literary Excellence – 1979, 1981,1983, 1985, 1988, 1994, 2007
 Doctor of Letters, Montana State University (1984)
 National Endowment for the Arts fellowship (1985)
 Western Heritage Award, Best Western Novel, English Creek (1985)
 Doctor of Letters, Lewis and Clark College (1987)
 Western Literature Association's Distinguished Achievement Award (1989)
 Evans Biography Award Heart Earth (1993)
 Mountains & Plains Booksellers Association (MPBA) 'Spirit of the West' award (1997)
 Pacific Northwest Writers Association Achievement Award (2002)
 Center for the American West's Wallace Stegner Award (2007)
 One Read book Whistling Season for Daniel Boone Regional Library, Missouri (2008)
 Willamette Writers' Lifetime Achievement Award (2014)

References

External links
Official website
Ivan Doig Archive at Montana State University
1977 Early Forest Research Part 1
1977 Early Forest Research Part 2
Long Interview with Ivan Doig on "The Whistling Season"
Short Interview with Ivan Doig on "The Whistling Season"

1939 births
2015 deaths
Writers from Montana
American memoirists
American non-fiction outdoors writers
20th-century American novelists
Medill School of Journalism alumni
University of Washington College of Arts and Sciences alumni
People from White Sulphur Springs, Montana
People from Pondera County, Montana
21st-century American novelists
American male novelists
Deaths from multiple myeloma
Deaths from cancer in Washington (state)
20th-century American male writers
21st-century American male writers
20th-century American non-fiction writers
21st-century American non-fiction writers
American male non-fiction writers